The Holland Hills Classic was a women's elite professional road bicycle race held annually between 2004 and 2016 in Limburg, the Netherlands. The race was categorised as a 1.1 UCI category race, and was organised by the Stichting Holland Ladies Tour, who also organised the Holland Ladies Tour.

Sponsorship
For sponsorship reasons the race held the official titles of the Gulpen Hills Classic between 2004 and 2007, the Valkenburg Hills Classic in 2010, the Parkhotel Rooding Classic in 2011, the Parkhotel Valkenburg Hills Classic in 2012 and the Boels Rental Hills Classic from 2013 until 2016.

History
In its first four years, the race was held in August with the start and finish in Gulpen. From 2008 to 2013, the start and finish were held in Valkenburg aan de Geul and in 2011 the race moved to the spring. From 2014, the start was in Sittard and the finish was on top of the Geulhemmerberg hill in Berg en Terblijt.

In September 2016, shortly after the organisers of the Amstel Gold Race announced their inaugural women's race for 2017 on mainly the same parcours, in the same region and in the same part of the season, the main sponsor Boels Rental and race director Thijs Rondhuis said there would not be a Hills Classic in 2017.

Past winners

References

External links

 
Recurring sporting events established in 2004
2004 establishments in the Netherlands
Women's road bicycle races
Cycle races in the Netherlands
Recurring sporting events disestablished in 2016
2016 disestablishments in the Netherlands
Defunct cycling races in the Netherlands
Cycling in Limburg (Netherlands)
Cycling in Sittard-Geleen
Cycling in Valkenburg aan de Geul
South Limburg (Netherlands)